Kolong may refer to:
 Kolong River, a river in Assam, India
 Kolong (film), a 2019 Malaysian horror film
 Kolong language, spoken in parts of Himachal Pradesh

See also 
 Kulung (disambiguation)